Rapicactus zaragosae, synonym Turbinicarpus zaragosae, is a species of plant in the family Cactaceae. It is endemic to Mexico. Its natural habitat is hot deserts. It is threatened by habitat destruction.

References

 Anderson, E.F., Fitz Maurice, W.A. & Fitz Maurice, B. 2002.  Turbinicarpus zaragosae.   2006 IUCN Red List of Threatened Species.   Downloaded on 23 August 2007.

Cactoideae
Cacti of Mexico
Endemic flora of Mexico
Vulnerable plants
Endangered biota of Mexico
Taxonomy articles created by Polbot